Anja Sønstevold (born 21 June 1992) is a Norwegian professional footballer who plays as a defender or midfielder for Serie A club Inter Milan and the Norway national team.

Club career
Sønstevold played in her youth at SF Grei and Linderud/Grei. In 2010, she joined the Toppserien club Kolbotn, where she played for 4 years, recording 113 top-flight appearances and scoring 10 goals. In 2015, she moved to the current league champions LSK Kvinner FK.

International career
Sønstevold went through several Norwegian youth teams and participated with the U-17 team in the qualification and the finals of the 2009 UEFA Women's Under-17 Championship in Nyon, where Norway finish in the fourth place. A year later she was part of the team that played at 2010 UEFA Women's Under-17 Championship, but failed to reach the finals. In 2011, she was in the team that qualified and reached the final of the 2011 UEFA Women's Under-19 Championship, when the team finish second after a massive lose for Germany, 8:1. For reaching the semi-finals, the Norwegians had already qualified for the 2012 FIFA U-20 Women's World Cup in Japan. Sønstevold was part of the squad that played the tournament. Norway reached the quarter-finals, but again they were defeated by Germany, 4:0. On 14 January 2014, she got her first senior international cap against Spain in La Manga, Spain. One year later, she was called for the 2015 Algarve Cup. On 23 April 2015 she was appointed to the provisional squad of 35 players for the 2015 FIFA Women's World Cup. She was initially dropped from the final squad on 14 May, but she was later called into the 23-player roster to replace Caroline Graham Hansen, who had to withdraw to an injury.

Career statistics

International

Scores and results list Norway's goal tally first, score column indicates score after each Sønstevold goal.

References

External links
 
 
 
 
 

1992 births
Living people
Women's association football midfielders
Norwegian women's footballers
Toppserien players
2015 FIFA Women's World Cup players
Norway women's international footballers
LSK Kvinner FK players
Kolbotn Fotball players
FC Fleury 91 (women) players
UEFA Women's Euro 2022 players
UEFA Women's Euro 2017 players